The Romance of Science is a Canadian scientific television series which aired on CBC Television in 1960.

Premise
Each episode featured dramatic portrayals of noted scientists. Niagara Film Productions produced the series for CBC Television.

Scheduling
Half-hour episodes were broadcast on Sundays at 5:30 p.m. (Eastern) from 5 June to 28 August 1960.

Episodes
 5 June 1960: James Watt and his improvements to steam engine technology
 12 June 1960: Michael Faraday discovers electromagnetic induction, starring William Needles
 John Dalton and his contributions to atomic theory
 26 June 1960: Carl Friedrich Gauss and his mathematical works such as statistics
 3 July 1960: Physicist Hermann von Helmholtz (Norman Ettlinger) and his development of electrodynamics
 10 July 1960: Chemist Antoine Lavoisier (Lloyd Bochner)
 17 July 1960: Charles Darwin (Michael Kane), inventor of evolutionary theory
 24 July 1960: Gottfried Leibniz and his development of infinitesimal calculus, starring Ivor Barry and Mavor Moore
 31 July 1960: Johannes Kepler and his work in mathematics and astronomy
 7 August 1960: Carl Linnaeus and his invention of the binary taxonomy of plants
 14 August 1960: Engineer and physicist William Thomson, 1st Baron Kelvin
 21 August 1960: Inventor and physicist Benjamin Thompson (Count Rumford) and his theories on heat
 28 August 1960: Sigmund Freud (Gilles Pelletier) and his development of psychoanalysis

References

External links
 

1960 Canadian television series debuts
1960 Canadian television series endings
1960s Canadian drama television series
CBC Television original programming